GSAT-19 is an Indian communications satellite launched by the Indian Space Research Organisation aboard a GSLV Mark III on 5 June 2017.

Satellite and payloads
The satellite will act as a testbed for the modular I-6K satellite bus, carrying experimental technologies such as ion thrusters for manoeuvring and stabilisation, active thermal control using thermal radiators, a miniaturised inertial reference unit, indigenously produced lithium-ion batteries, and C-band traveling-wave-tube amplifiers.

Rather than traditional transponders, GSAT-19 carries four Ku/Ka-band forward link beams and four Ku/Ka-band return link beams, providing much higher data throughput than India's previous communications satellites. It additionally carries a Geostationary Radiation Spectrometer (GRASP) payload, which will "monitor and study the nature of charged particles and the influence of space radiation on satellites and their electronic components".

Orbit raising and station keeping
This was followed by a series of orbit raising operations (using an on-board LAM and chemical thrusters) to place the satellite in the intended geostationary orbital slot.

References

GSAT satellites
Spacecraft launched by India in 2017
Spacecraft launched by GSLV rockets